Ty - supermodel, Cycle 3 was the third Cycle of the Russian reality show on the STS  TV channel, a competition of non-professional aspiring models for a contract with an international modeling agency and a prize of $250,000. The host was presenter Alexander Tsekalo.

In each episode the chosen finalists, who lived in a house together in Moscow, faced different competitions in modeling, sports and entertainment with an elimination round at the end of each episode where one of them was sent home. The winner of the competition was 18-year-old Tatyana Pekurovskaya.

Contestants
(ages stated are at time of contest)

Summaries

Call-out order

 The contestant was eliminated
 The contestant quit the competition
 The contestant was part of a non-elimination bottom two
 The contestant won the competition

Episode 1 = The Sexy Charm of the African Tribal Queen,Africa Cultural Face High Fashion Beauty

Episode 2 = Queen Of Fashion In Dessert With Ostrich Or Camel,Naked on The Dessert

Episode 3 = Animating a Personality Psychopath As A Serial Killer,Fight Of Straight And Curly Hair

Episode 4 = Battle Glam With Swinging In Chandeliers,Juvenile Delinquency

Episode 5 = Heroes Film For Makeover,TV Video For Apple,Group Music Video,Dior Motion Video

Episode 6 = Trapped in the Freshness of a Neutragena Glass Bottle, Halfway Beauty in the Currents of Water

Episode 7  = High End Fashion Blends Jade Emperor Culture,Creates High End Dramatic And Wild Photos On Mossy Rocks With Snails

Episode 8 = High End Fashion At Difference's Place In Greece,Greek Yogurt Pose With Local's

Episode 9 = Take a Photo With The Creation Of Past Sculptures,Trapped Like The Story Of The Prophet Yunus In Aquarium With A Whale

Episode 10 = Doing Amazing In High Fashion Magazine With Extreme Hair Cut,The Catalogue

Episode 11 = "The New Africas Face" Cover Look Documenter Video For Next "Africa's Top Model"

Episode 12 = Ambasador Brand Of Mercy,Make Over,Pantene,The Queen Africa,Cover Magazine

References

External links 

Top Model series (Russia)
2006 Russian television seasons